The Seeheimer Kreis (English: "Seeheim Circle") is an official internal grouping in the Social Democratic Party of Germany (SPD). The group describes itself as "undogmatic and pragmatic" and generally takes moderately liberal economic positions.

It was founded in September 1974. One of the prominent founding members is Gesine Schwan, a former SPD candidate for the German Presidency. , the group's spokespeople are Marja-Liisa Völlers, Dirk Wiese, and Uwe Schmidt. The Circle is named after its long-standing meeting place, Seeheim (Bergstraße), just south of Frankfurt.

History 

In the 1950s, a group of conservative or traditional members of the SPD met regularly in an informal group known as the Kanalarbeiter (Canal Workers). They were considered to be one of the most influential groups within the larger Social Democratic Party.

The most prominent members of the Canal Workers were Egon Franke and Annemarie Renger. 

Parallel to the development of the Canal Workers, an additional conservative grouping within the SPD was initiated in 1969 by Günther Metzger, known as the Metzger Circle, which soon developed in 1972 into the Arbeitskreis Linke Mitte (Centre Left Work Circle), which can be considered the forerunner of today's Seeheim Circle.
In the course of the late 1960s the Jusos, the youth organization of the Social Democrats, the left wing of the SPD increased in influence and numbers.

A meeting in the Dorint-Hotel in Lahnstein in December 1974 is considered to be the official founding of the Seeheim Circle; however, already in 1973 a group of around 40 Social Democrats met at the invitation of Hans-Jochen Vogel to discuss a way to come out of the "theoretical and ideological defensive" posed by the left wing of the party. Other founding members include Richard Löwenthal and Gesine Schwan. Though the Seeheim Circle ended up not accomplishing their initially stated goal of serving as a provocative ideological counterweight within the Party, they experienced early successes in gaining influence in SPD staffing policy and in pushing through broader Social Democratic Party decisions. The early Seeheimers followed in the footsteps of the Canal Workers, whose motto was "nothing happens without us".

From 1978 to 1984, the group, which was also known as the Lahnstein Circle, met in the Lufthansa Training Center in Seeheim on the Bergstraße, the origin of the name "Seeheimers."

Between 1974 and 1982, Chancellor Helmut Schmidt included several Seeheimers in his Cabinet, who had supported him during the debates in the party about the industrial use of nuclear energy and the NATO Double-Track Decision. After the end of the Helmut Schmidt Era, the Kanalarbeiter, who had represented the interests of traditional, non-intellectual union workers, definitively merged with the Seeheim Circle, which in contrast was considered to be "intellectual." During conflicts during the 1980s within the Social Democrats about the direction of the party, the Seeheim Circle opposed the alliance between the Social Democrats and Alliance '90/The Greens. The Seeheimers also distinguished themselves during this period from other currents within the SPD by supporting reunification with East Germany as a political goal. After reunification with East Germany in 1990, the Seeheimers added two prominent Social Democrats from the former GDR to their ranks, Stephan Hilsberg and Markus Meckel.  During the 1998–2005 chancellorship of Gerhard Schröder, the Seeheimers supported his changes to social services.

Personnel 

The Circle is led by Siemtje Möller, Dirk Wiese, and Dagmar Ziegler. Other leading members of the Seeheimer are Doris Barnett, Fritz-Rudolf Körper, Edgar Franke, Sport Committee Chairwoman Dagmar Freitag, Carsten Schneider, who belong to a group known as the Sprecherkreis. Members of the advisory board for the Seeheimer include Sigmar Gabriel and Ulla Schmidt. Previous members have included Rolf Schwanitz, Thomas Oppermann and Wolfgang Tiefensee.

Political views 

The Seeheim Circle focuses on pragmatic solutions in social policy, financial policy, and economic policy. The party strives to align social welfare with financial possibilities, a commitment to give and take in social welfare, a reduction of the national debt, the necessity of reforms through pragmatic handling, and an open minded relationship to globalization. Moreover, the Seeheim Circle views demographic change as a central policy field and is ready to take social policy in directions which could lie outside of Social Democratic tradition. However, this readiness for innovation would not contradict the Party Program of the Social Democrats.

References

1974 establishments in West Germany
Social Democratic Party of Germany
Political party factions in Germany
Economic liberalism